Chester S. Furman (February 14, 1842 – July 22, 1910) was an American soldier who received the Medal of Honor for valor during the American Civil War.

Biography
Furman joined the 6th Pennsylvania Reserves in July 1861 and was transferred to the US Army Signal Corps in October 1863. He received the Medal of Honor on August 3, 1897 for his actions on the second day of the Battle of Gettysburg.

Medal of Honor citation
Citation:

The President of the United States of America, in the name of Congress, takes pleasure in presenting the Medal of Honor to Corporal Chester S. Furman, United States Army, for extraordinary heroism on 2 July 1863, while serving with Company A, 6th Pennsylvania Reserves, in action at Gettysburg, Pennsylvania. Corporal Furman was one of six volunteers who charged upon a log house near Devil's Den, where a squad of the enemy's sharpshooters were sheltered, and compelled their surrender.

See also

List of Medal of Honor recipients for the Battle of Gettysburg
List of American Civil War Medal of Honor recipients: A–F

References

External links

Military Times

1842 births
1910 deaths
Union Army soldiers
United States Army Medal of Honor recipients
People from Edgar County, Illinois
People of Pennsylvania in the American Civil War
American Civil War recipients of the Medal of Honor